Chavante may be 
 Xavante language
 Otí language